Owusu Afriyie Martin (born 1 September 1980) is a Ghanaian former professional footballer. Nicknamed Arriki, he played as a midfielder in Ghana, Spain, Portugal, Austria, and England.

Career
Born in Accra, Afriyie began his career with Real Sportive, before earning a move to Spanish side Badajoz after just a season. His performances ensured a move to bigger club Málaga, where he spent a season on loan at Portuguese club Chaves. In 2001 Arriky returned to Ghana to spend two seasons with Hearts of Oak, before spending a further two seasons in Austria with Feldkirchen. Short spells in Spain with Linares and Melilla, and in England with Enfield Town, preceded a final return to Hearts of Oak, where he finished his career in 2007.

References

External links
FIFA
GhanaWeb.com

1980 births
Living people
Ghanaian footballers
Ghana under-20 international footballers
Expatriate footballers in Spain
Expatriate footballers in Portugal
Expatriate footballers in Austria
Ghanaian expatriate footballers
CD Badajoz players
Málaga CF players
CD Linares players
UD Melilla footballers
G.D. Chaves players
Accra Hearts of Oak S.C. players
Enfield Town F.C. players
Ghanaian expatriate sportspeople in Portugal
Ghanaian expatriate sportspeople in Austria
Real Sportive players
Ghanaian expatriate sportspeople in Spain
Alumni of the Accra Academy
Association football midfielders
Segunda División players
Segunda División B players